Kivy is a free and open source Python framework for developing mobile apps and other multitouch application software with a natural user interface (NUI). It is distributed under the terms of the MIT License, and can run on Android, iOS, Linux, macOS, and Windows.

Kivy is the main framework developed by the Kivy organization, alongside Python for Android, Kivy iOS, and several other libraries meant to be used on all platforms. In 2012, Kivy got a $5000 grant from the Python Software Foundation for porting it to Python 3.3. Kivy also supports the Raspberry Pi which was funded through Bountysource.

The framework contains all the elements for building an application such as:
 extensive input support for mouse, keyboard, TUIO, and OS-specific multitouch events,
 a graphic library using only OpenGL ES 2, and based on Vertex Buffer Object and shaders,
 a wide range of widgets that support multitouch,
 an intermediate language (Kv) used to easily design custom widgets.

Kivy is an evolution of the PyMT project.

Code example 
Here is an example of the Hello world program with just one button:

from kivy.app import App
from kivy.uix.button import Button

class TestApp(App):
    def build(self):
        return Button(text="Hello World")

TestApp().run()

Kv language 
The Kv language is a language dedicated to describing user interface and interactions in Kivy framework. As with other user interface markup languages, it is possible to easily create a whole UI and attach interaction. For example, to create a Loading dialog that includes a file browser, and a Cancel / Load button, one could first create the base widget in Python and then construct the UI in Kv.

In main.py:
class LoadDialog(FloatLayout):
    def load(self, filename): pass
    def cancel(self): pass

And in the associated Kv:
#:kivy 1.11.1

<LoadDialog>:
    BoxLayout:
        size: root.size
        pos: root.pos
        orientation: "vertical"

        FileChooserListView:
            id: filechooser

        BoxLayout:
            size_hint_y: None
            height: 30

            Button:
                text: "Cancel"
                on_release: root.cancel()

            Button:
                text: "Load"
                on_release: root.load(filechooser.path, filechooser.selection)

Alternatively, the layout (here, Box Layout) and the buttons can be loaded directly in the main.py file.

Related projects 
 Buildozer, generic Python packager for Android and iOS.
 Plyer, platform-independent Python wrapper for platform-dependent APIs.
 PyJNIus, dynamic access to the Java/Android API from Python.
 Pyobjus, dynamic access to the Objective-C/iOS API from Python.
 Python for Android, toolchain for building and packaging Python applications for Android.
 Kivy for iOS, toolchain for building and packaging Kivy applications for iOS.
 Audiostream, library for direct access to the microphone and speaker.
 KivEnt, entity-based game engine for Kivy.
 Kivy Garden, widgets and libraries created and maintained by community.
 Kivy SDK Packager, scripts for Kivy SDK generation on Windows, macOS and Linux.
 Kivy Remote Shell, remote SSH+Python interactive shell application.
 KivyPie, Raspbian-based distribution running latest Kivy framework on the Raspberry Pi.
 OSCPy, a fast and reliable OSC implementation.
 Condiment, preprocessor that includes or removes Python code portion, according to environment variables.
 KivyAuth, social login via Google, Facebook, GitHub and Twitter accounts in Kivy apps.
 KivMob, AdMob support for Kivy apps.
 KivyMD, a set of Material Design widgets for Kivy.

Google Summer of Code 
Kivy participated in Google Summer of Code under Python Software Foundation.
 Kivy in GSoC'2014.
 Kivy in GSoC'2015.
 Kivy in GSoC'2016.
 Kivy in GSoC'2017.

See also 

 Pygame, another Python game API, a layer over Simple DirectMedia Layer
 Cocos2d
 Panda3D
 Pyglet
 Scripting Layer for Android

References

External links 
 

Cross-platform mobile software
Cross-platform software
Free software programmed in Python
Python (programming language) libraries
Software using the MIT license